The Households Party is a union of eight small right-wing parties, formed to participate in the 2013 parliamentary election.

Electoral results

Parliament

References

Defunct political parties in Iceland
Political parties established in 2013
2013 establishments in Iceland